Jason Young (born 31 January 1980) is a Thai actor and singer. Young graduated from Pathum Kongka School in Bangkok and Columbia College Hollywood, majoring in film and television program, in Los Angeles. He is of Australian and Thai heritage.

Young was nominated for Best Leading Actor for his role in the film F. Hilaire in 2015 Bangkok Critics Assembly Awards. He was also nominated for Best Villain for his role in TV Series Muk Liam Petch in 2012 Siamdara Star Awards.

As of 2022, he applied for and became a Senior Protective Services Officer with Queensland Police in Australia.

Works

Music 

 Young Jason (1995)
 Jason Youngster (1996)
 C.J.L. friends club (1997) 
 Be My Guest Album Most Wanted (2010)

Movie 
 Mr Boon-Um (1996)
 666 Death Happens (2009)
 F. Hilaire (2015)
 FRIENDZONE  (2019)

TV Series 

 The Crown Princess (2018)

Stage play 

 Bunlang Mek the musical
   The Last Day Show: Will I Survive?
   Return of The Last Day Show: Will I Survive

References

Citations

General references

Jason Young
Jason Young
Living people
1980 births